Dempsey Cothrin Wilson (March 11, 1927 – April 23, 1971) was an American racecar driver.

Wilson was born in Los Angeles, California. He began his racing career on Southern California short tracks, racing roadsters, then midgets and stock cars. He drove in the USAC Championship Car series, racing in the 1956, 1958–1965, and 1968–1969 seasons with 32 starts, including the Indianapolis 500 races in 1958, 1960, 1961, and 1963.  He finished in the top ten 4 times, with his best finish in 8th position in 1960 at Milwaukee.  Outside of racing, Wilson owned a business called "Dempsey Wilson Racing Cams," which refurbished camshafts. He died in Duarte, California, at City of Hope after a long battle with mesothelioma.

Indianapolis 500 results

World Championship career summary
The Indianapolis 500 was part of the FIA World Championship from 1950 through 1960. Drivers competing at Indy during those years were credited with World Championship points and participation. Dempsey Wilson participated in 2 World Championship races but scored no World Championship points.

References

1927 births
1971 deaths
Indianapolis 500 drivers
Racing drivers from Los Angeles